Shal is a city in Qazvin Province, Iran.

Shal may also refer to:
 Shal, Ardabil
 Shal Brick Company, Qazvin Province
 Shal District, in Qazvin Province